Yao Tandong (born July 1954) is a Chinese glaciologist, a member of the Chinese Academy of Sciences (CAS). He served as Director of the CAS Institute of Tibetan Plateau Research (ITP) in Beijing.

Biography
Yao was born in July 1954 in Tongwei County, Gansu. He received his B.S. in 1978 and M.S in 1982 both from the Department of Geography, Lanzhou University in Gansu, China. He received his Ph.D from the Institute of Geographic Sciences and Natural Resources Research (IGSNRR), Chinese Academy of Sciences (CAS) in 1986. He worked as post-doctor in France and the USA from 1987 to 1990.

Career
He worked at Cold and Arid Regions Environmental and Engineering Research Institute (CAREERI), CAS, which was formerly known as Lanzhou Institute of Glaciology and Geocryology, from 1990 to 2003 and was deputy director of the institute from 1995 to 2000 and director from 2000 to 2003. He has been director of the Institute of Tibetan Plateau Research (ITP), CAS since its founding in 2003.

Yao received awards for his research including the Natural Science Award and the Ho Leung Ho Lee Prize. He was recognized by the Science Association of China with a "Distinguished Scientist of China" award in 2005. Yao was elected to the Chinese Academy of Sciences in 2007.

References

External links
Yao Tandong

1954 births
Living people
Chinese geologists
Chinese glaciologists
Lanzhou University alumni
Members of the Chinese Academy of Sciences
Scientists from Gansu